Dahod railway station (station code: DHD) is a railway station serving Dahod town, in Dahod district of Gujarat state of India. It is under Ratlam railway division of Western Railway zone of Indian Railways. It is located on New Delhi–Mumbai main line of the Indian Railways.

The Dahod–Indore Rail Project is scheduled for completion at the end of 2022. Dahod will be connect to Indore through Dhar and Jhabua. Dahod–Indore Rail Project is 204.76 km long.

Trains

The following Passenger, MEMU, and Superfast trains start from here:

 12929/30 Valsad–Dahod Intercity Superfast Express
 69189/90 Dahod–Anand MEMU
 69117/18 Dahod–Vadodara MEMU
 69119/20 Vadodara–Dahod MEMU
 69181/82 Ratlam–Dahod MEMU
 69187/88 Dahod–Ratlam MEMU
 59393/94 Dahod–Bhopal Fast Passenger

References

Railway stations in Dahod district
Ratlam railway division